Al-Arbi may refer to:
Abdul Subhan Qureshi
Mohammed al-Arbi al-Fasi

See also
Arbi (disambiguation)